1-(4-Chlorophenyl)silatrane is an extremely toxic organosilicon compound which was developed by M&T Chemicals as a single-dose rodenticide. It was never registered as rodenticide, except for experimental use. 1-(4-Chlorophenyl)silatrane was one of the chemicals studied in the Project Coast.

Toxicity
1-(4-Chlorophenyl)silatrane is a GABA receptor antagonist and it destroys nervous functions in the central nervous system of vertebrates, primarily in the brain and possibly in the brain stem. It's a rapid acting convulsant, causing convulsions within 1 minute in mice and rats. Death occurred within 5 minutes. It is therefore likely to induce poison shyness. In field trials, it was less effective than zinc phosphide against wild rats.

See also
Phenylsilatrane

References

Convulsants
Organosilicon compounds
Nitrogen heterocycles
Oxygen heterocycles
Neurotoxins
Rodenticides
Chemical weapons
GABAA receptor negative allosteric modulators
Poisons
Chloroarenes
Atranes
Silicon heterocycles